Earth 2 is an American science fiction television series which aired on NBC from November 6, 1994, to June 4, 1995. The show was canceled after one season of 21 episodes. It follows the journey and settlement of a small expeditionary group called the Eden Project, with the intent to journey to an Earth-like planet called G889 in an attempt to find a cure to an illness called "the syndrome". The series was created by Billy Ray, Michael Duggan, Carol Flint, and Mark Levin, produced by Amblin Entertainment and Universal Television, and filmed primarily in northern New Mexico around the Santa Fe area. The series' music was composed by David Bergeaud, and the executive producers were Duggan, Levin, and Flint.

The show had a successful premiere, reaching eighth place for the week; however, ratings dropped off quickly as the Nielsen ratings share had dropped from 23% to 9%. During its run, it had been nominated for a Primetime Emmy, Saturn, and other awards. In 2005, the entire series was released on DVD in a four-disc set.

Plot 
In 2192 most of the human population had fled Earth to live on large orbiting space stations. Only a small number of humans remain on the Earth's surface as the Earth had become mostly uninhabitable.

Billionaire Devon Adair's eight-year-old son, Ulysses Adair, had contracted a rare, fatal disease called "the syndrome", a condition whose existence is not acknowledged by the government and medical community. It is theorized that this disease, which affects only children, is somehow caused by the lack of an Earth-like environment. Most children who are born with the disease do not live past the age of nine.

Desperate to save her son, Devon puts together a group who will pioneer the effort to settle a planet 22 light-years away from Earth, on which other families with members thus afflicted can settle. The eventual colonization of the planet, however, is opposed by the government. Secret monitoring and agent infiltration threaten the creation of the colony of New Pacifica. Hours before Adair's group intends to leave, a bomb is discovered, set to explode the hour the ship would leave. The Eden Project leaves immediately, jettisoning the bomb before detonation. In "The Church of Morgan", it is revealed this bomb was planted by the Council to stop the ship from leaving.

Twenty-two years later, the ship arrives at G889, but it crash lands a great distance from the planned landing site. With her group scattered on the planet and supplies missing, Devon marshals what survivors she can find and begins heading west to the planned site of New Pacifica.

During their travels, Adair and her companions slowly learn to cope with life on the alien world, which at first seems superficially Earth-like but which is gradually revealed to have a very different ecology, including at least two different native sentient and humanoid species—a short and stout race at the level of development of hunter-gatherers, with a propensity towards kleptomania, known as "Grendlers" and the much taller and lankier "Terrians", who are capable of telepathic communication, can tear rents and tunnels in the earth through a pseudo-psychic process and whose well-being is somehow linked to that of the planet.  The survivors also learn that the Council—a government group that seems to wield most of the power on the space stations—wants to gain control of G889 for resettlement. Through their various experiments, they have learned that they cannot remove the Terrians without killing the planet. This complicates matters, because Devon's son, who has been healed by the Terrians and who had begun to exhibit some of their unique characteristics, has become the key to the Council's plan for the planet.

Cast

Main 
 Debrah Farentino as Devon Adair
 Joey Zimmerman as Ulysses Adair
 Clancy Brown as John Danziger
 J. Madison Wright as True Danziger
 Sullivan Walker as Yale
 Jessica Steen as Dr. Julia Heller
 Rebecca Gayheart as Bess Martin
 John Gegenhuber as Morgan Martin
 Antonio Sabàto, Jr. as Alonzo Solace

Recurring and guest stars 
 Richard Bradford as Commander Broderick O'Neill
 Terry O'Quinn as Reilly
 Tim Curry as Gaal
 Jeff Kober as Z.E.D.
 Marjean Holden as Danica
 Rockmond Dunbar as Baines
 Roy Dotrice as The Elder
 Virginia Madsen as Alonzo Solace's Dance Partner
 Kelli Williams as Mary
 Walter Norman as Walman
 Marcia Magus as Magus
 Tierre Turner as Zero
 Kirk Trutner as Cameron

Characters 
The interactions among the original crew, the convicts, the government and the local aliens and their planet forms the basis of many of the story's plot lines, as the colonists learn more about their new home while trying to avoid detection by the Council.
 Devon Adair The leader of the expedition and whose own son is afflicted with the Syndrome. As the leader, she attempts to balance directing the group as obstacles are encountered while confronting the possibility that her son may not survive his sickness.
 Ulysses Adair Nicknamed "Uly", he is the eight-year-old son of the expedition's leader, Devon Adair. He was born with the Syndrome, an illness which convinced his mother that he could be cured if raised on a planet with access to fresh air, clean water and sunshine. His arrival on G889 and eventual connection to the Terrians is one of the keys to the colonization of the world and a recurring plot theme.
 John Danziger Previously an indentured worker aboard the space station from which the group leaves. His daughter is most important to him, but he also assumes the role of protector of the group.
 True Danziger The ten-year-old daughter of John Danziger, and also previously an indentured worker on the space station from which the expedition departed. She forms a bond with Uly, initially one of jealousy and dislike, but eventually a close friendship.
 Yale A former convict and cyborg whose memory has been erased and behavior altered under a government program for the purpose of becoming a tutor for the children of wealthy families. He later recovers some of his memories and learns he did not commit a violent crime but instead defied the Council.
 Dr. Julia Heller A genetically modified junior physician the colonists later learn is an agent for the Council.
 Morgan Martin A government official supervising the Eden Project, husband to Bess Martin.
 Bess Martin Wife of Morgan Martin, who grew up in the mines of Earth.
 Alonzo Solace A cold sleep pilot far older than he looks, and eventually a love interest of Dr. Heller.
 Reilly Julia Heller's contact on the council, who eventually is revealed to be a computer program. In "All About Eve", the creator of the EVE program reveals that Reilly is part of the same program.
 Zero The crew's bipedal worker droid capable of multiple tasks.

Life on G889 
The landscape and climate of the new planet where the ship crashed seems very much like that of harsher climates on Earth, such as the southwestern United States. Water is scarce and scrub grows out of rock formations. In this area, three different species of life are discovered by Devon Adair and her group.
  Soon after arrival the colonists come into contact with a semi-intelligent race of traders and scavengers named Grendlers. In "A Memory Play", it is revealed that a grendler's saliva is a cure for virtually any disease.
  Exploring further, the group encounters an intelligent subterranean indigenous species named the Terrians, who seem to have a symbiotic relationship with the planet and can only communicate with the colonists through a dreamscape that few of them understand.
 Kobas Small monkey-like creatures with a leather-like skin and large eyes. Kobas possess sharp claws, which they use like darts to incapacitate their intended food source. Once struck by a Koba-claw, a victim falls into a near-death coma for two to three days, but awakens with no permanent damage. Kobas have a great talent for mimicry. They are friendly toward those who are friendly to them, but are quick to defend themselves against possible predators.
 Humans During the series the colonists learn they are not the only humans on the planet; it had previously been used as a penal colony so the government could learn more about how to colonize the planet.

Production

Notable aspects of the series 
Earth 2 broke new ground by placing Devon Adair as one of the first female commanders in a science fiction television show, preceding the much better-known Captain Kathryn Janeway of Star Trek: Voyager by more than two months.

The overarching plot of the show and various individual elements helped explore the Gaia hypothesis, mainly through the Syndrome, its effects on many children, and the subsequent healing of the illness after the Eden Project arrives on G889.

During the show, various political and social themes were addressed as well. Throughout the series aspects of the relation of Terrians to the planet and to the colonists reflect the history of colonies with native populations and slavery. In "The Enemy Within", Julia is left behind by the group because of her treachery, addressing briefly what punishments are moral or even inhumane. Another aspect of this issue is addressed in "The Man Who Fell to Earth (Two)", when the group meets a man named Gaal who claims to be an astronaut but is revealed as a marooned criminal; when it is revealed that G889 had been used for many years as a penal colony, questions arise as to the motivations of the Council and their right to do so. In "Redemption", the group encounters a genetically enhanced killer called Z.E.D., who was left on the planet to dispose of all the humans he finds, who at the time had been criminals.

Filming locations 
Exterior shots filmed in New Mexico locations such as Kasha Katuwe Tent Rocks and Diablo Canyon, provided the setting for the series.

Episodes 
(Note: Due to presentation choices of the network, some episodes of this series were aired out of narrative sequence. The table below includes the episode numbering of most recent home media release of the series.)

Broadcast 
The series premiered on November 6, 1994, with a two-hour pilot episode ("Earth 2: First Contact") that ran from 7 p.m. to 9 p.m. EST (including advertisements—it was later split into two episodes for syndication). The following week it moved to a regular time slot. On April 23, 1995, two individual episodes were aired back-to-back from 7 p.m. to 9 p.m. EST.

It was also aired in Austria, Australia, Canada, Finland, Germany, Hungary, Italy, Netherlands, New Zealand, Poland, Spain and United Kingdom, later in 1995 Greece and Egypt in the fall of 1997, and in Turkey and Norway in 1998. In 2011 it aired on TV4 Science Fiction in Sweden.

Other media

DVD release and online streaming 
The complete series, comprising 21 episodes including the two-hour pilot, was released on DVD on July 19, 2005, in the United States in Region 1 format, on four dual-sided discs. The two parts of "First Contact" originally aired as the pilot in one feature-length 90-minute episode (95 minutes and 30 seconds on the Region 4 DVD).

The set includes all 21 episodes in order according to the air date—not the production order—resulting in two episodes ("Natural Born Grendlers" and "Flower Child") being ordered after the final episode, "All About Eve". These two were originally not aired until after the planned season finale had been aired and it was then known that the series had been cancelled; with the series not renewed the season finale became the series finale. In the order of production, and more importantly of the story line, the episode "Natural Born Grendlers" should have followed "Life Lessons". (Clue: Alonzo has a cut on his forehead in "Promises" which he got in "Natural Born Grendlers". However, most people place it after "Promises, Promises" because the three Gaal episodes were shown as a group.) The episode "The Boy Who Would Be Terrian King" (day 104 on the planet) takes place before "After the Thaw" (day 109 on the planet), and "Flower Child" should have followed "Survival of the Fittest". In addition to the episodes, the set includes eight deleted and extended scenes, and out-takes.

Another DVD set titled Earth 2: The Complete Series was released on May 28, 2012, for Region 2.  It corrected the above-mentioned episode order problem by placing them in narrative order, and included a card explaining that the trailers attached to the end of some episodes would not match the corrected play order.

Netflix in the United States streamed the episodes in production order.

Novels 
Three Earth 2 novels were published between December 1994 and May 1995. The first was a novelization of the two-part premiere. The remaining two were original stories.
 Earth 2: A Novel (Melissa Crandall, December 1994) 
 Puzzle (Sean Dalton, February 1995) 
 Leather Wings (John Vornholt, May 1995)

References

External links 

 
 
 

1994 American television series debuts
1995 American television series endings
1990s American science fiction television series
American adventure television series
English-language television shows
Fictional terrestrial planets
NBC original programming
Post-apocalyptic television series
Space adventure television series
Television series about colonialism
Television series by Amblin Entertainment
Television series by Universal Television
Television series set in the 22nd century
Television series set on fictional planets
Television shows filmed in New Mexico